The Léez (Leez, Lées, Léès, Lees) is a left tributary of the Adour, in the Southwest of France.

Name 
This name proceeds from an Aquitanian hydronym Lez / Liz.

Geography 
The Léez rises near Gardères in the north of the plateau of Ger. It flows north through the Vic-Bilh area in the east of the Pyrénées-Atlantiques and joins the Adour in the French département of the Gers, upstream from Aire-sur-l'Adour.

Main tributaries 
 (L) the Petit-Léez,
 (L) the Gabassot,
 (R) the Larcis,
 (R) the canal of Bernède, long of 2 km, fed by the Adour.

References

Rivers of France
Rivers of Gers
Rivers of Pyrénées-Atlantiques
Rivers of Nouvelle-Aquitaine
Rivers of Occitania (administrative region)